Grand empress dowager (also grand dowager empress or grand empress mother) ( (太皇太后)) was a title given to the grandmother, or a woman from the same generation, of a Chinese, Japanese, Korean, or Vietnamese emperor in the Chinese cultural sphere.

Some grand empress dowagers held regency during the emperor's childhood. Some of the most prominent empress dowagers extended their regencies beyond the time when the emperor was old enough to govern alone. This was seen as a source of political turmoil, according to the traditional views of Chinese historians.

Chinese grand empresses dowager

Han dynasty 
 Grand Empress Dowager Lü Zhi (188 BC – 180 BC), during the reign of Emperor Qianshao and Emperor Houshao
 Grand Empress Dowager Bo (156 BC – 155 BC), during the reign of Emperor Jing
 Grand Empress Dowager Dou (141 BC – 135 BC), during the reign of Emperor Wu
 Grand Empress Dowager Shangguan (74 BC – 37 BC), during the reign of Emperor Xuan and Emperor Yuan
 Grand Empress Dowager Qiongcheng (33 BC – 16 BC), during the reign of Emperor Cheng
 Grand Empress Dowager Wang Zhengjun (7 BC – 13 AD), during the reign of Emperor Ai and Emperor Ping
 Grand Empress Dowager Fu (帝太太后 instead of 太皇太后) (7 BC – 3 BC), during the reign of Emperor Ai

Cao Wei 
 Grand Empress Dowager Bian (226–230), during the reign of Emperor Ming

Jin dynasty (266–420) 
 Grand Empress Dowager Li Lingrong (397–400), during the reign of Emperor An

Liu Song dynasty 
 Grand Empress Dowager Xiao Wenshou (422–423), during the reign of Emperor Shao
 Grand Empress Dowager Lu Huinan (464–466), during the reign of Emperor Qianfei

Chen dynasty 
 Grand Empress Dowager Zhang Yao'er (566–568), during the reign of Emperor Fei

Northern Wei dynasty 
 Grand Empress Dowager Helian (452–453), during the reign of Emperor Wencheng
 Grand Empress Dowager Feng (471–490), during the reign of Emperor Xiaowen
 Grand Empress Dowager Lou Zhaojun (559–560), during the reign of Emperor Fei

Northern Qi dynasty 
 Grand Empress Dowager Hu (577), during the reign of Emperor Youzhu

Northern Zhou dynasty 
 Grand Empress Dowager Ashina (579–581), during the reign of Emperor Jing

Tang dynasty 
 Grand Empress Dowager Guo (824–848), during the reign of Emperor Jingzong, Emperor Wenzong, Emperor Wuzong and Emperor Xuānzong
 Grand Empress Dowager Zheng (859–865), during the reign of Emperor Yizong

Song dynasty 
 Grand Empress Dowager Cao (1067–1085), during the reign of Emperor Shenzong
 Grand Empress Dowager Gao Taotao (1085–1093), during the reign of Emperor Zhezong
 Grand Empress Dowager Wu (1189–1197), during the reign of Emperor Guangzong
 Grand Empress Dowager Xie (1194–1203), during the reign of Emperor Ningzong
 Grand Empress Dowager Xie Daoqing (1274–1276), during the reign of Emperor Gong; the proceeding two emperors were her grandsons but they were fleeing from the Mongols

Liao dynasty 
 Grand Empress Dowager Xiao Yanmujin (died 933), during the reign of Emperor Taizong
 Grand Empress Dowager Xiao Noujin (1055–1057), during the reign of Emperor Daozong
 Grand Empress Dowager Xiao Dali (1101–1118), during the reign of Emperor Tianzuo

Jin dynasty (1115–1234) 
 Tangkuo, Grand Empress Dowager of Qingyuan Palace (1135–1136), during the reign of Emperor Xizong
 Heshilie, Grand Empress Dowager of Mingde Palace (1135–1143), during the reign of Emperor Xizong

Yuan dynasty 
 Grand Empress Dowager of Dagi (1321–?), during the reign of Emperor Yingzong
 Grand Empress Dowager Budashiri (1333–1338), during the reign of Emperor Huizong

Ming dynasty 
 Grand Empress Dowager Zhang (1435–1442), during the reign of the Zhengtong Emperor
 Grand Empress Dowager Zhou (1487–1504), during the reign of the Hongzhi Emperor
 Grand Empress Dowager Wang (1505–1518), during the reign of both the Hongzhi Emperor and the Zhengde Emperor
 Grand Empress Dowager Zheng (1565–1630)  (posthumous title), awarded by the Hongguang Emperor

Qing dynasty 
 Grand Empress Dowager Zhaosheng (1661–1688), during the reign of the Kangxi Emperor
 Grand Empress Dowager Cixi (1908), during the reign of the Xuantong Emperor (Puyi)

Japanese grand empresses dowager

See also
 Empress dowager
 Từ Dụ (1810–1902), Vietnamese royal and only ever person to be crowned Great Grand Empress Dowager

References

 
Titles